Booth and the Bad Angel is a studio album by Booth and the Bad Angel, a collaborative project between Angelo Badalamenti and Tim Booth. It was released in 1996. It peaked at number 35 on the UK Albums Chart.

Track listing

Personnel 
Credits adapted from liner notes.
 Tim Booth – vocals, words
 Angelo Badalamenti – keyboards, vocals (on 6 and 9)
 Bernard Butler – guitar (on 1, 3, 6, 7, 9 and 10), percussion (on 1), piano (on 5 and 10), bass guitar (on 10)
 Mark Egan – bass guitar (on 1, 2, 3, 4, 5, 6, 7, 8, 9 and 11)
 Graham Hawthorne – drums (on 1, 3, 6, 8, 9, 10 and 11)
 Chloe Goodchild – vocals (on 2, 4 and 8)
 Ira Siegel – guitar (on 2, 4, 5, 8 and 11)
 Jeff Mironov – guitar (on 2 and 5)
 Gota – drums (on 2 and 4)
 Makoto Sakamoto – drums (on 5 and 7)
 Allison Cornell – vocals (on 5 and 7)
 Joy Askew – vocals (on 7)
 Brian Eno – vocals (on 9)

Charts

References

External links 
 

1996 debut albums
Albums produced by Angelo Badalamenti
Fontana Records albums
Booth and the Bad Angel albums